Route 185 is a highway in eastern Missouri.  Its northern terminus is at Route 100 west of Washington; its southern terminus is at Route 8 in Potosi.  A spur of Highway 185 goes into Meramec State Park and Meramec Conservation Area.

Route description

History

Major intersections

Related route

References

185
Transportation in Washington County, Missouri
Transportation in Franklin County, Missouri